The team jumping in equestrian at the 1932 Summer Olympics in Los Angeles was held on 14 August. The event was called the "Prix des Nations" at the time.

Results

References

Team jumping